Lebidema is a genus of beetles in the family Carabidae, containing the following species:

 Lebidema davicorne (Murray, 1857)
 Lebidema pellucidum Britton, 1940
 Lebidema ruandense Burgeon, 1937

References

Lebiinae